The 2018 Chhattisgarh Legislative Assembly election was held to elect members to the Legislative Assembly of the Indian State of Chhattisgarh. The election was held in two phases for a total of 90 seats; the first for 18 seats in South Chhattisgarh was held on 12 November 2018, and the second for the remaining 72 were held on 20 November.

The INC got a landslide victory winning 68 seats against the ruling BJP's 15 seats, and consequently formed the government after 15 years as opposition party. Incumbent Chief Minister Raman Singh resigned on 11 December, the day of counting and declaration of result, taking the responsibility for the defeat in the elections. Elected to the Assembly from Patan, INC leader Bhupesh Baghel took office on 17 December as the third Chief Minister of the State.

Background 
The tenure of Chhattisgarh Legislative Assembly ends on 5 January 2019.

Schedule 
The Election Commission of India announced the election dates on 6 October 2018. It said the election would take place in two phases: phase one on 12 November in the left-wing extremism-affected areas that encompassed eighteen constituencies, and on 20 November in the remaining constituencies. The Commission also announced that the Model Code of Conduct came into effect with the said announcement and that the results would be declared on 11 December.

Candidates

Opinion polls 
Opinion polls showed a tough competition between the Bharatiya Janata Party (BJP) and the Indian National Congress (INC), but the alliance between Janta Congress Chhattisgarh (JCC) and Bahujan Samaj Party (BSP) also showed similar numbers to that of the former two.

Polling 
According to the Election Commission of India, a total of 4,300 booths for the region's registered 1.62 million women and 1.55 million male voters were set up for the first phase of polls. The first phase of election, in 18 constituencies, saw a voter turnout of 76.42 per cent according to the Commission, an increase from 75.06 per cent in 2013. This came despite calls from the Naxalites in the region to boycott the election. A total of 125,000 police and paramilitary personnel were posted across the 18 constituencies, which were spread over the Naxalism-affected districts such as Bastar, Kanker, Sukma, Bijapur, Dantewada, Narayanpur, Kondagaon and Rajnandgaon. However, the polls saw two major disruptions. An improvised explosive device (IED) went off in Katekalyan, in Dantewada, before voting began. In Bijapur district, an encounter between Naxalites and the 204th battalion of the Central Reserve Police Force's (CRPF) COBRA unit left 10 Naxalites killed and five CRPF personnel injured.

The campaigning ahead of the second phase concluded on 18 November. In an incident of another IED blast, three security personnel were killed that day in the Bheji and Elarmadgu villages of Sukma district. However, voting on 20 November went "peaceful and incident-free". A turnout of 76.34 per cent was reported by the Commission, while updating the figures of the first phase to 76.39 per cent. The Commission set up 19,336 polling stations for this phase of polling.

Overall, a total of 76.35 percent was reported across the State, a minor drop from 77.40 percent in 2013. 38 constituencies, most of which fell primarily in rural areas, reported a turnout of more than 80 percent. Kurud reported the highest turnout at 88.99 percent, followed by Kharsiya at 86.81 percent, while Bijapur reported the lowest at 44.68 percent. Ahead of counting and the declaration of result on 11 December, 28 companies of the Central Armed Police Forces were posted to guard rooms were the EVMs were kept.

Exit polls 
Most of the exit polls predicted a "tight finish" between the BJP and the INC.

Results

Seats and vote-share 
The results gave the Indian National Congress a clear majority and differed from the trend shown by the Opinion and Exit polls. The BJPs count fell drastically, while the INC formed a majority Government.
The seat and vote share was as follows -

Elected members

See also
 Elections in Chhattisgarh
 2018 elections in India

References

External links
 2018 Chhattisgarh Legislative Assembly election at The Times of India

History of Chhattisgarh (1947–present)
Chhattisgarh
2018
2018